Ada Lovelace Day is an annual event held on the second Tuesday of October to celebrate and raise awareness of the contributions of women to STEM fields. It is named after mathematician and computer science pioneer Ada Lovelace. It started in 2009 as a "day of blogging" and has since become a multi-national event with conferences.

History
The day was founded in the United Kingdom in 2009 by Suw Charman-Anderson on the second Tuesday in October as a means of raising awareness about the contributions of women to STEM fields: science, technology, engineering and mathematics.

In 2022, Charman-Anderson announced that this would be the last year in which the organization that she founded, Finding Ada, would organize an annual flagship Ada Lovelace Day event in England.

Since its inception, Ada Lovelace Day has become international in scope, with events organized by groups ranging from museums, professional societies, universities, colleges and high schools. While Ada Lovelace Day is the second Tuesday of October, events celebrating women in STEM typically span the period of October and November, and include diverse activities ranging from in-person and virtual Wikipedia Editathons to panel discussions, film screenings and more.

While this celebration of the often overlooked contributions of women in STEM was named for Ada Lovelace, activities have expanded since 2009 to highlight the diverse contributions of women in STEM over time and different countries. Events have featured policy initiatives and scholarship relating to equity, diversity and inclusion that provide spaces and platforms for dialogue and discussion about how unconscious bias(es) function to create barriers to women's participation and advancement in the professional fields of STEM.

References

External links 
 

2009 establishments
Awareness days
Women in science and technology
October observances